Penmaenmawr Urban District was an Urban District in Caernarfonshire, Wales, from 1894 to 1974, absorbed into the District of Aberconwy. It was based on the town of Penmaenmawr.

References

Penmaenmawr
Urban districts of Wales
Caernarfonshire